Jackie McInally (21 November 1936 – 8 July 2016) was a Scottish professional footballer who played as an inside forward.

Early life
McInally was born in Ayr. Prior to his football career he undertook a plumbing apprenticeship, and he spent two years in the Royal Scots Greys as part of his National Service.

Career
McInally spent his early career in amateur football with Kello Rovers, Minishant Amateurs, and Crosshill Thistle. He then played in the Scottish Football League with Kilmarnock, Motherwell and Hamilton Academical, making over 400 appearances.

He won the Scottish Amateur Cup with Crosshill Thistle in 1959, First Division with Kilmarnock in 1965, and the Second Division with Motherwell in 1969.

He also made one appearance for a Scottish League XI, in an exhibition match against a 'Scotland XI' in January 1961.

Later and personal life
After retiring as a footballer McInally ran a number of shops, worked in a fork lift factory, and managed a paint wholesaler. His son Alan was also a professional footballer.

References

1936 births
2016 deaths
Scottish footballers
Kello Rovers F.C. players
Kilmarnock F.C. players
Motherwell F.C. players
Hamilton Academical F.C. players
Scottish Football League players
Association football inside forwards
Footballers from Ayr
Scottish Football League representative players